The Eastern Basketball Association was a professional basketball league based in the United States. The league began in 1946 and was known as the Eastern Pennsylvania Basketball League. After one season the league changed its name to the Eastern Professional Basketball League. In 1979, the league changed its name again to the Continental Basketball Association.

Eastern Pennsylvania Basketball League / Eastern Professional Basketball League (1946–1970)

1946–47 season

Teams
Allentown Rockets
Binghamton Triplets 
Hazleton Mountaineers
Lancaster Red Roses
Pottsville Pros 
Reading Keys
Wilkes-Barre Barons

Regular season standings

Postseason

League map

Notes
The Binghamton Triplets re-located to Pottsville, Pennsylvania in December 1946.

1947–48 season

Teams
Harrisburg Senators
Hazleton Mountaineers
Lancaster Red Roses
Philadelphia Lumberjacks
Pottsville Packers
Reading Keys
Sunbury Mercuries
Williamsport Billies

Regular season standings

Postseason

League map

1948–49 season

Teams
Harrisburg Senators
Lancaster Rockets
Pottsville Packers
Reading Keys
Sunbury Mercuries
Williamsport Billies
York Victory A.C.

Regular season standings

Postseason

League map

1949–1950 season

Teams
Berwick Carbuilders
Harrisburg Senators 
Lancaster Rockets
Pottsville Packers
Reading Rangers
Sunbury Mercuries
Williamsport Billies
York Victory A.C.

Regular season standings

Postseason

League map

1950–51 season

Teams
Berwick Carbuilders
Harrisburg Senators 
Lancaster Rockets
Pottsville Packers
Reading Rangers
Sunbury Mercuries
Williamsport Billies
York Professionals

Regular season standings

Postseason

League map

1951–52 season

Teams
Ashland Greens 
Lancaster Rockets
Hazleton Mountaineers 
Pottsville Packers
Reading Merchants
Sunbury Mercuries
Williamsport Billies
York Cleaners 

Regular season standings

Postseason

League map

1952–53 season

Teams
Berwick Carbuilders
Harrisburg Capitols
Lancaster Rockets
Lebanon Seltzers
Sunbury Mercuries
Williamsport Billies

Regular season standings

Postseason

League map

1953–54 season

Teams
Berwick Carbuilders
Lancaster Rockets
Lebanon Seltzers 
Hazleton Hawks
Sunbury Mercuries
Williamsport Billies

Regular season standings

Postseason

League map

1954–55 season

Teams
Carbondale Celtics 
Lancaster Rockets
Hazleton Hawks
Scranton Miners
Sunbury Mercuries
Wilkes-Barre Barons
Williamsport Billies

Regular season standings

Notes
William Morgan, the league commissioner since its inception, was succeeded by Harry Rudolph.

1955–56 season

Teams
Hazleton Hawks
New York–Harlem Yankees
Scranton Miners
Sunbury Mercuries
Trenton Capitols 
Wilkes-Barre Barons
Williamsport Billies

Regular season standings

1956–57 season

Teams
Easton-Phillipsburg Madisons
Hazleton Hawks
Scranton Miners
Sunbury Mercuries
Wilkes-Barre Barons
Williamsport Billies

Regular season standings

1957–58 season

Teams
Easton-Phillipsburg Madisons
Hazleton Hawks
Reading Keys 
Scranton Miners
Sunbury Mercuries
Wilkes-Barre Barons
Williamsport Billies
Wilmington Jets

Regular season standings

Notes and events
Two expansion franchises were admitted to the league in September 1957. They were clubs in Reading, Pennsylvania and Wilmington, Delaware which would become the Reading Keys and Wilmington Jets, respectively.
Harry Rudolph was elected league president in September 1957. Barry Sherman was elected secretary and public relations director. Elected members of the board of governors were Clem Palevitch, Richard Smith and Jack Agnor.

1958–59 season

Teams
Allentown Jets
Baltimore Bullets
Easton-Phillipsburg Madisons
Hazleton Hawks
Rochester Colonels 
Scranton Miners
Sunbury Mercuries
Wilkes-Barre Barons
Williamsport Billies

Regular season standings

Notes and events
League president Harry Rudolph announced that Bill Spivey of the Wilkes-Barre team was fined $10 for fighting during a game. It was Spivey's second fine of the season and Rudolph said if another incident occurred it would result in a suspension.

1959–1960 season

Teams
Allentown Jets
Baltimore Bullets
Easton-Phillipsburg Madisons
Hazleton Hawks
Rochester Colonels 
Scranton Miners
Sunbury Mercuries
Wilkes-Barre Barons
Williamsport Billies

Regular season standings

Notes and events
During the offseason before the 1959–1960 season, the league announced their collegiate draft was postponed so the league could vote on an expansion franchise from Baltimore, Maryland (which became the Baltimore Bullets).
In January 1960, the league announced it had scrapped a rule permitting National Basketball Association (NBA) teams only one option per season on players. This rule would allow NBA team to call-up and send down players as much as they wished.

1960–61 season

Teams
Allentown Jets
Baltimore Bullets
Easton-Phillipsburg Madisons
Hazleton Hawks
Scranton Miners
Sunbury Mercuries
Wilkes-Barre Barons
Williamsport Billies

Regular season standings

Notes and events
The league held its annual preseason meeting on June 13, 1960 where league president Harry Rudolph was re-elected to a two-year term. He was also elected treasurer of the league. Ray Saul was re-elected as public relations director and secretary.
EPBL president Harry Rudolph announced plans to file a $1,000,000 defamation of character lawsuit against National Football League (NFL) commissioner Pete Rozelle for saying, "several players in the Eastern Basketball [League] were accused of gambling on games involving teams for which they formerly played." The comment was about Rozelle's decision to bar NFL player Gene Lipscomb from joining the EPBL Baltimore Bullets.

1961–62 season

Teams
Allentown Jets
Camden Bullets 
Easton-Phillipsburg Madisons 
Hazleton Hawks
Scranton Miners
Sunbury Mercuries
Trenton Colonials 
Wilkes-Barre Barons
Williamsport Billies

Regular season standings

Notes and events
At the league's annual meeting during the offseason before the 1961–62 season a proposal to relocate the Baltimore franchise to New England was to be proposed. The potential move would have been to either Bridgeport or Milton, Connecticut as facilitated by the prospective owner, Herb Kables. The proposal was ultimately rejected.
The league postponed its collegiate draft due to the 1961 NCAA University Division men's basketball gambling scandal.
Rules were adopted before the 1961–62 season to mirror the rules of the National Basketball Association (NBA).
The Allentown Jets announced they had signed Andrew "Fuzzy" Levane to a one-year contract as coach in September 1961.
In October 1961, the EPBL passed a resolution that would give a lifetime ban to any player who left an EPBL team for another league. The rule came in response to players who left the league the fledgling American Basketball League (ABL).
In December 1961, a "State Basketball Championship" for Pennsylvania was proposed by Pittsburgh Rens owner Lenny Litman between his ABL team, the NBA Philadelphia Warriors and the EPBL Sunbury Mercuries.
EPBL president Harry Rudolph announced that the Camden franchise had been fined $150 for failing to have the required seven players in uniform for a game on January 27, 1962 in which Camden lost to Williamsport 153–126. According to the Associated Press several Camden players were delayed by car trouble forcing the team to play with six players.
EPBL president Harry Rudolph announced that Trenton Colonials coach Harry Landa had been fined for pushing a referee during a game on February 3, 1962. According to Rudolph, if Landa failed to pay the fine he would be suspended for the remainder of the season.

1962–63 season

Teams
Allentown Jets
Camden Bullets 
Scranton Miners
Sunbury Mercuries
Trenton Colonials 
Wilkes-Barre Barons
Williamsport Billies

Regular season standings

Notes and events
During the offseason before the 1962–63 season, the EPBL considered admitting two new franchises in Philadelphia and Carbondale, Pennsylvania/ The Philadelphia franchise was not approved as the team's owners could not find a suitable venue. The Carbondale franchise was admitted to the league, but that deal was eventually voided when team owners failed to meet their financial obligations according to league president Harry Rudolph.
In November 1962, after the American Basketball League (ABL) folded, EPBL president Harry Rudolph announced that players who were banned for leaving their EPBL teams for the ABL could apply for re-admittance to the league if they wrote a letter to the league president with $25 as payment for a fine. Players affected by the ban were: Hal Lear, David Gunther, Hershel Thurner, Kelly Coleman and Spike Gibson.
In April 1963, EPBL president Harry Rudolph announced that Camden Bullets player Tom Hoover was fined $100 and suspended for four games following a physical altercation with referee Jim Armstong.

1963–64 season

Teams
Allentown Jets
Camden Bullets 
Scranton Miners
Sunbury Mercuries
Trenton Colonials 
Wilkes-Barre Barons
Williamsport Billies
Wilmington Blue Bombers

Regular season standings

Notes and events
During the offseason before the 1963–64, the Wilmington Blue Bombers of Wilmington, Delaware were admitted into the league. The league also announced it had abolished its territorial draft.
The Wilmington Blue Bombers announced they had hired Alexander Severance as coach during the offseason before the 1963–64 season.
In October 1963, the Camden Bullets announced that Charles "Buddy" Donnelly was hired as coach.

1964–65 season

Teams
Allentown Jets
Camden Bullets 
Scranton Miners
Sunbury Mercuries
Trenton Colonials 
Wilkes-Barre Barons
Wilmington Blue Bombers

Regular season standings

Notes and events
EPBL president Harry Rudolph was re-elected to a two-year term during the offseason before the 1964–65 season. The league also re-elected Ray Saul as secretary. David Waters was newly elected to the position of vice president. Hal Simon, Spike Shandelman and Arthur Pachter were elected to the board of governors.
In June 1964, the EPBL held its annual collegiate draft in Allentown, Pennsylvania.
Before the 1964–65 season, the EPBL established a three-point field goal from 25 feet away from the basket.
Brendan McCann replaced Pete Monska as the Allentown Jets' head coach during the offseason before the 1964–65 season.

1965–66 season

Teams
Allentown Jets
Camden Bullets 
Harrisburg Patriots
Johnstown C-J's
New Haven Elms
Scranton Miners
Sunbury Mercuries
Trenton Colonials 
Wilkes-Barre Barons
Wilmington Blue Bombers

Regular season standings

1966–67 season

Teams
Allentown Jets
Asbury Park Boardwalkers
Harrisburg Patriots
Hartford Capitols
New Haven Elms
Scranton Miners
Sunbury Mercuries
Trenton Colonials 
Wilkes-Barre Barons
Wilmington Blue Bombers

Regular season standings

1967–68 season

Teams
Allentown Jets
Asbury Park Boardwalkers
Binghamton Flyers 
Bridgeport Flyers 
Hartford Capitols
Scranton Miners
Sunbury Mercuries
Trenton Colonials 
Wilkes-Barre Barons
Wilmington Blue Bombers

Regular season standings

1968–69 season

Teams
Allentown Jets
Binghamton Flyers 
Hartford Capitols
New Haven Elms
Scranton Miners
Springfield Hall of Famers 
Sunbury Mercuries
Trenton Colonials 
Wilkes-Barre Barons
Wilmington Blue Bombers

Regular season standings

1969–1970 season

Teams
Allentown Jets
Binghamton Flyers 
Hamden Bics
Hartford Capitols
Scranton Miners
Sunbury Mercuries
Wilkes-Barre Barons
Wilmington Blue Bombers

Regular season standings

Eastern Basketball Association (1970–78)

1970–71 season

Teams
Allentown Jets
Camden Bullets
Delaware Blue Bombers
Hamden Bics
Hartford Capitols
Scranton Apollos
Sunbury Mercuries
Trenton Pat Pavers

Regular season standings

Postseason

Notes
William J. Montzman is named the commissioner of the league, making him the third person to serve in that capacity. He succeeded Harry Rudolph, who was commissioner since 1955.

ABA and NBA affiliations
Hartford Capitols: Boston Celtics (NBA), Dallas Chaparrals (ABA)

1971–72 season

Teams
Allentown Jets
Cherry Hill Demons 
Hamden Bics
Hartford Capitols
Hazleton Bits 
Scranton Apollos
Trenton Pat Pavers
Wilkes-Barre Barons

Regular season standings

Postseason

ABA and NBA affiliations
Hartford Capitols: Philadelphia 76ers (NBA), Dallas Chaparrals (ABA)

1972–73 season

Teams
Allentown Jets
Garden State Colonials
Hamden Bics
Hamburg Bullets 
Hartford Capitols
Hazleton Bullets 
Scranton Apollos
Trenton Pat Pavers

Regular season standings

1973–74 season

Teams
Allentown Jets
Cherry Hill Rookies
East Orange Colonials
Hamilton Pat Pavers
Hartford Capitols
Hazleton Bullets
Scranton Apollos
Wilkes-Barre Barons 

Regular season standings

Notes
The East Orange Colonials (originally the Garden State Colonials) were owned by author Larry Armour and his 14 year-old son, Andy Armour, who was the youngest team owner in EBA history. The Colonials had a working agreement with three NBA teams: the Cleveland Cavaliers, the Golden State Warriors and the Detroit Pistons.

1974–75 season

Teams
Allentown Jets
Cherry Hill Rookies
Hazleton Bullets
Scranton Apollos

Regular season standings

1975–76 season

Teams
Allentown Jets
Connecticut Gold Coast Stars 
Hazleton Bullets
Lancaster Red Roses
Long Island Sounds
Scranton Apollos
Trenton Capitols
Wilkes-Barre Barons

Regular season standings

ABA and NBA affiliations
Gold Coast Stars: Phoenix Suns (NBA), Houston Rockets (NBA), San Antonio Spurs (ABA)
Scranton Apollos: Buffalo Braves (NBA), Phoenix Suns (NBA), Portland Trail Blazers (NBA), Chicago Bulls (NBA), Spirits of St. Louis (ABA)

1976–77 season

Teams
Allentown Jets
Brooklyn Pros 
Hartford Downtowners
Hazleton Bullets 
Jersey Shore Bullets 
Lancaster Red Roses
Scranton Apollos
Syracuse Centennials
Wilkes-Barre Barons 

Regular season standings

 Syracuse Centennials folded midseason

Timeline
October 25, 1976: Syracuse was admitted into the EBA. Team owners were professional football players Walt Patulski, Jim Braxton, Mike Kruczek, Mike Kadish and Tony Greene.

NBA affiliations
Allentown Jets: New York Knicks, Chicago Bulls, Houston Rockets
Brooklyn Pros: New York Nets, New Orleans Jazz, Kansas City Kings
Scranton Apollos: Los Angeles Lakers, Golden State Warriors, Portland Trail Blazers 
Syracuse Centennials: Buffalo Braves, Milwaukee Bucks, Atlanta Hawks, Detroit Pistons
Hartford Downtowners: Boston Celtics, Indiana Pacers, Denver Nuggets
Hazleton Bullets: Phoenix Suns, Seattle SuperSonics, Cleveland Cavaliers
Lancaster Red Roses: Philadelphia 76ers, San Antonio Spurs, Washington Bullets

1977–78 season

Teams
Allentown Jets
Anchorage Northern Knights
Brooklyn Dodgers
Jersey Shore Bullets
Lancaster Red Roses
Long Island Ducks
Providence Shooting Stars
Quincy Chiefs
Washington Metros
Wilkes-Barre Barons

Regular season standings

Postseason

NBA affiliations 
Anchorage Northern Knights: Phoenix Suns, Seattle SuperSonics
Jersey Shore Bullets: Atlanta Hawks, New Orleans Jazz
Quincy Chiefs: Boston Celtics, Kansas City Kings

References

Eastern Basketball Association